In quantum physics, a quantum fluctuation (also known as a vacuum state fluctuation or vacuum fluctuation) is the temporary random change in the amount of energy in a point in space, as prescribed by Werner Heisenberg's uncertainty principle. They are minute random fluctuations in the values of the fields which represent elementary particles, such as electric and magnetic fields which represent the electromagnetic force carried by photons, W and Z fields which carry the weak force, and gluon fields which carry the strong force. Vacuum fluctuations appear as virtual particles, which are always created in particle–antiparticle pairs. Since they are created spontaneously without a source of energy, vacuum fluctuations and virtual particles are said to violate the conservation of energy. This is theoretically allowable because the particles annihilate each other within a time limit determined by the uncertainty principle so they are not directly observable. Although the particles are not directly detectable, the cumulative effects of these particles are measurable. For example, without quantum fluctuations, the "bare" mass and charge of elementary particles would be infinite; from renormalization theory the shielding effect of the cloud of virtual particles is responsible for the finite mass and charge of elementary particles. Another consequence is the Casimir effect. One of the first observations which was evidence for vacuum fluctuations was the Lamb shift in hydrogen. In July 2020, scientists reported that quantum vacuum fluctuations can influence the motion of macroscopic, human-scale objects by measuring correlations below the standard quantum limit between the position/momentum uncertainty of the mirrors of LIGO and the photon number/phase uncertainty of light that they reflect.

Field fluctuations
In quantum field theory, fields undergo quantum fluctuations. A reasonably clear distinction can be made between quantum fluctuations and thermal fluctuations of a quantum field (at least for a free field; for interacting fields, renormalization substantially complicates matters). An illustration of this distinction can be seen by considering quantum and classical Klein-Gordon fields: For the quantized Klein–Gordon field in the vacuum state, we can calculate the probability density that we would observe a configuration  at a time  in terms of its Fourier transform  to be

In contrast, for the classical Klein–Gordon field at non-zero temperature, the Gibbs probability density that we would observe a configuration  at a time  is

Note that the following three points are closely related:

 Planck's constant has units of action (joule-seconds) instead of units of energy (joules),
 the quantum vacuum state is Lorentz invariant (although not manifestly in the above), whereas the classical thermal state is not (the classical dynamics is Lorentz invariant, but the Gibbs probability density is not a Lorentz invariant initial condition).

We can construct a classical continuous random field that has the same probability density as the quantum vacuum state, so that the principal difference from quantum field theory is the measurement theory (measurement in quantum theory is different from measurement for a classical continuous random field, in that classical measurements are always mutually compatible – in quantum mechanical terms they always commute).

See also 

 Casimir effect
 Cosmic microwave background
 Quantum annealing
 Quantum foam
 Vacuum energy
 Virtual particle
 Virtual black hole
 Stochastic interpretation
 Zitterbewegung

References

Quantum mechanics
Inflation (cosmology)
Articles containing video clips
Energy (physics)